Robert Pattison may refer to:

 Robert E. Pattison (1850–1904), governor of Pennsylvania
 Robert Everett Pattison (1800–1874), American clergyman and president of Colby College